Laksjøen is a lake in Lierne municipality in Trøndelag county, Norway. The administrative center of Lierne, Sandvika, lies on the northern shore of the lake. The lake is fed by the lake Sandsjøen to the east, and the water exits the lake in the north and later joins the river Sanddøla which later joins the river Namsen.

See also
List of lakes in Norway

References

Lierne
Lakes of Trøndelag